Jefferson County School District 251 is a school district headquartered in Rigby, Idaho.

History
In 2015, the district had 5,106 students. In 2019, that number was up to 5,901. Luke O'Roark of the Post Register wrote in 2019 that the district is "one of the fastest growing school districts in the area."

Lisa Sherick served as superintendent until 2019. In 2019, Chad Martin became the superintendent.

In addition to Rigby, the district includes Lewisville, Menan, and Roberts.

2021 shooting
On May 6, 2021, Rigby Middle School was the site of a school shooting that left two students and an adult injured. A female sixth-grader was taken into custody. In response, Governor of Idaho Brad Little tweeted, "I am praying for the lives and safety of those involved in today's tragic events. Thank you to our law enforcement agencies and school leaders for their efforts in responding to the incident."

Education
 7-12 schools
 Jefferson High School - Menan

 High schools
 Rigby High School - Rigby

 Middle schools
 Farnsworth Middle School - Rigby
 Rigby Middle School - Rigby

 Elementary schools
 Cottonwood Elementary School - Rigby
 Harwood Elementary School - Rigby
 Jefferson Elementary School - Rigby
 Midway Elementary School - Menan
 Roberts Elementary School - Roberts
 South Fork Elementary School - Rigby

References

External links

 Jefferson County School District 251

school districts in Idaho
Education in Jefferson County, Idaho